The château du Lutzelbourg is a château founded by Pierre de Lutzelbourg in the 11th century on a rocky promontory overlooking the Zorn valley in France at an altitude of 322m, in Lutzelbourg (Moselle).
It has been classified as a Historic Monument since February 1930 in France

History 
The history of the castle begins with Pierre, the son of Count Frédéric de Montbéliard, of very noble lineage since he is related to the powerful house of Savoy. On the death of his grandmother, the Marquise Adélaïde of Suse, in December 1091, he became the heir to the Magraviate of Suse (Italy). However, the title is claimed by the Emperor Henry IV of the Holy Empire. By obligation, Pierre must then settle on his ancestral lands between Philippsbourg and the valley of the Zorn. Few sources mention the name "Lutzelbourg", which comes from Lutzel Burg meaning Small Castle, before the 12th. It does not appear until 1126 in the founding notice of the Convent of Saint Jean Saverne by Count Pierre de Lutzelbourg. Pierre took this name when he took possession of the site.

Around 1100, Pierre negotiated the exchange of the priory of Saint-Quirin with castel de Lutzelbourg at the abbey of Marmoutier in Alsace. Réginald will be the only son of the union of Pierre and Ita, his death a few days after Christmas 1142 leaves the county without descendants. It is the cousin of Pierre, the bishopric of Metz | bishop of Metz Étienne, who receives sovereignty around 1150 and gives custody of it to the first Lords of Lutzelbourg.

Two families had an important role in the history of the castle between the 13th and 14th centuries: the lords of Fénétrange and the Lutzelsteins share possession of the estate and successively impose their laws (toll duty in Lutzelbourg for example). They were ousted around 1450 by the Palatine Counts during the conquest of the castle.

In 1523, Louis the Pacific ordered the destruction of the castle of Lutzelbourg to stop the desires of Franz von Sickingen.

In 1840, the ruins of the castle of Lutzelbourg were saved from demolition by Adolf Germain, a notary in Phalsbourg because the owners wanted to sell the materials from the ruin to the companies that were building the railway line.

After several successive sales, Eugène Koeberlé, professor of Medicine in Strasbourg, bought the site. Around 1900, he decided to consolidate the ruins, to undertake excavations and to build the neo-Romanesque room. In 1909, he published in Strasbourg his work  Les Ruines du château de Lutzelbourg  where he reports his discoveries and hypotheses.

Architecture 
The large square tower, built in the 12th century has a height of 24 meters and its walls are 2.40 meters thick. It was built by Count Pierre de Lutzelbourg and his son Reginald.

Gallery

See also 

 Château de Hohbarr

References

Bibliography 
 Dagobert Fischer, Lutzelbourg, le château et le village, étude historique, Impr. de G. Crépin-Leblond 1871 (ASIN: B001C9HWJ0)
 Eugène Koeberlé, Les ruines du château de Lutzelbourg, Imprimerie alsacienne, Strasbourg 1909. (Une copie de son œuvre se trouve à la BNU Strasbourg.)
 Les ruines du château de Lutzelbourg (D’après un article paru dans les « Mémoires de la Société d’archéologie lorraine » – Année 1871)

External links 
 Le château de Lutzelbourg 
 Lutzelbourg et son château 

Buildings and structures in Moselle (department)
Castles in France
11th-century fortifications